The 6th South African Grand Prix was a motor race, run to Formula Libre rules, held on 1 January 1960 in East London. The race was run over 60 laps of the circuit, and was won by Belgian driver Paul Frère, his second Grand Prix victory following the 1952 Grand Prix des Frontières. Stirling Moss finished second and also set the fastest lap of the race. Local driver Syd van der Vyver finished in third place.

The race was the first of two South African Grands Prix in 1960, with the 7th South African Grand Prix to be held on 27 December 1960.

Results

References

Grand Prix, 1960
1960
South African Grand Prix
South African Grand Prix